Renault, a French automobile manufacturer, has been associated with Formula One as both team owner and engine manufacturer for various periods since 1977. In 1977, the company entered Formula One as a constructor, introducing the turbo engine to Formula One with its EF1 engine. In 1983, Renault began supplying engines to other teams. Renault engines continued to be raced until 1986.

Renault returned to Formula One in 1989 as an engine manufacturer. It won five drivers' titles and six constructors' titles between 1992 and 1997 with Williams and Benetton, before ending its works involvement after 1997, though their engines continued to be used without works backing until 2000.

In 2000, Renault acquired the Enstone-based Benetton Formula team (formerly Toleman). Renault became a works engine manufacturer again in 2001, and in 2002 the Enstone-based team was re-branded as Renault. The team won the drivers' and constructors' championships in 2005 and 2006.

By 2011, Renault had sold its shares in the Enstone-based team, though it continued to use the Renault chassis name in 2011. Renault remained in the sport as an engine manufacturer, winning four drivers' and constructors' titles with Red Bull Racing in 2010–2013.

The company bought the Enstone-based team again in 2016 and re-branded it as Renault. The team didn't win in the following five seasons and was re-branded as Alpine in 2021 with the Renault marque remaining as engine manufacturer.

As a team owner, Renault has won two constructors' and drivers' championships, while as an engine manufacturer it has 12 constructors' and 11 drivers' championships. It has collected over 160 wins as engine supplier, ranking fourth in Formula One history.

Constructor

Équipe Renault Elf (1977–1985)

1977 season

Renault's first involvement in Formula One was made by the Renault Sport subsidiary. The Renault RS01 was well known for its Renault-Gordini V6 1.5 L turbocharged engine, the first regularly used turbo engine in Formula One history. Jabouille's car and engine proved highly unreliable and became something of a joke during its first races, earning the nickname of "Yellow Teapot" and failing to finish any of its races despite being comparatively powerful.

The first race the team, under the name Equipe Renault Elf, entered was the 1977 French Grand Prix, the ninth round of the season, but the car was not yet ready. The car's first qualifying session was not a success, and Jabouille qualified 21st out of the 30 runners and 26 starters, 1.62 seconds behind pole sitter James Hunt in the McLaren. Jabouille ran well in the race, running as high as 16th before the car's turbo failed on lap 17. The team missed the German and Austrian Grands Prix as the car was being improved after its British disappointment. He had a poor start but ran as high as sixth before the suspension failed on lap 40.

The team's poor qualifying form returned in Italy, as Jabouille qualified 20th. He ran outside the top 10 until his engine failed on lap 24, continuing their awful run of reliability. Jabouille failed to qualify in Canada; as 27 drivers entered the race, only one would not qualify, and this was Jabouille as he ended up last, over 7.5 seconds behind the fastest qualifier Mario Andretti of Lotus, and almost two seconds behind his nearest rival, Rupert Keegan, in the Hesketh. After this, Renault did not travel to the season finale in Japan.

1978 season

The following year was hardly better, characterised by four consecutive retirements caused by blown engines, but near the end of the year, the team showed signs of success.

Jabouille secured Renault's best qualifying position to date, with sixth place, just 0.71 seconds behind polesitter Niki Lauda in the Brabham. He dropped out of the points early in the race before retiring with electrical problems on lap 39. At Long Beach, Jabouille qualified 13th but retired as the turbo failed again on lap 44. He was twelfth in qualifying for the team's first Monaco Grand Prix, and gave the team their first finish in Formula One, finishing in tenth place four laps down on race-winner Tyrrell's Patrick Depailler.

1979 season

Expanding to two drivers with René Arnoux joining Jabouille, the team continued to struggle although Jabouille earned a pole position in South Africa. By mid-season, both drivers had a new ground-effect car, the RS10, and at Dijon for the French Grand Prix the team legitimised itself with a brilliant performance in a classic race. The two Renaults were on the front row in qualifying, and pole-sitter Jabouille won the race, the first driver in a turbocharged car to do so, while Arnoux and Gilles Villeneuve were involved in an extremely competitive duel for second, Arnoux narrowly getting beaten to the line. While Jabouille ran into hard times after that race, Arnoux finished second at Silverstone in the following race and then repeated that at the Glen, proving it was not a fluke.

1980–83 seasons

Jabouille continued to have problems with retirements, but in his only points finish he emerged victorious in Austria. At the end of the year, Jabouille crashed heavily at the Canadian GP and suffered serious leg injuries, which effectively ended his career as a Grand Prix driver. In his three years with the team, Prost showed the form that would make him a Formula One legend and the Renaults were among the best in Formula One, twice finishing third in the Constructors' Championships and once second. Arnoux left for rival Ferrari after 1982 and was replaced by American Eddie Cheever. In , Renault and Prost came very close to winning the drivers' title but were edged out by Nelson Piquet (Brabham-BMW) at the last race of the season in South Africa. After the end of the season, a rival fuel company said that the fuel used by the Brabham-BMWs in South Africa had exceeded the maximum Research Octane Number of 102 permitted under the Formula One regulations. BMW said that this was incorrect and FISA released a dossier supporting their stance. No action was taken.

1984–85 seasons

Prost was fired two days after the 1983 season following his public comments about the team's lack of development of the Renault RE40 which resulted in his loss to Piquet and the team's loss to Ferrari in the 1983 championship. He subsequently joined McLaren, while Cheever left to join Alfa Romeo. The team turned to Frenchman Patrick Tambay (who had left Ferrari) and Englishman Derek Warwick (formerly of Toleman) to bring them back to prominence. Driven by Frenchman François Hesnault, the car only lasted 8 laps before a clutch problem forced it to retire. In 1985, major financial problems emerged at Renault and the company could no longer justify the large expenses needed to maintain the racing team's competitiveness. CEO Georges Besse pared down the company's involvement in F1 from full-fledged racing team to engine supplier for the  season before taking it entirely out of F1 at the end of that year.

Renault F1 Team (2002–2010)
On 16 March 2000, Renault purchased Benetton Formula Limited for $120 million, to return to Formula One. The history of the team acquired by Renault started in 1981 as the Toleman Motorsport team, based in Witney, Oxfordshire, England. In 1986, the team was renamed to Benetton Formula, following its purchase in 1985 by the Benetton family. In 1992/3 the team moved a few miles to a new base in Enstone. When reporting the purchase the International Herald Tribune commented that "the team will not race under the Renault name until it is ready to win and reap the marketing benefits". It was not until 2002 that this name change occurred.

2002 season

In , Benetton was rebranded as Renault F1 and contested the season with drivers Jarno Trulli and Jenson Button who scored 23 points during the season.

2003 season

His replacement was Spain's Fernando Alonso, who had been considered impressive as a test driver the previous year. Alonso won the 2003 Hungarian Grand Prix, the first time Renault had won a Grand Prix since the 1983 Austrian Grand Prix. Renault was innovative during this period producing non-standard designs such as the 111° 10-cylinder engine for the 2003 RS23 which was designed to effectively lower the centre of gravity of the engine and thus improve the car's handling. This eventually proved too unreliable and heavy, so Renault returned to a more conventional development route.

2004 season

In , the team were contenders for second place in the Constructors' Championship. Trulli won the Monaco Grand Prix, but his relationship with Renault (particularly with team principal and Trulli's ex-manager Flavio Briatore) deteriorated after he was consistently off the pace in the latter half of the year, and made claims of favouritism in the team towards Alonso (though the two teammates themselves remained friendly).

Commentators regularly point to the French Grand Prix as the final straw for Briatore, where Trulli was overtaken by Rubens Barrichello in the final stages of the last lap, costing Renault a double podium finish at their home Grand Prix. He subsequently announced he was joining Toyota for the following year and in fact left Renault early, driving the Toyota in the last two races of the 2004 season. Hoping to secure second place in the Constructors' Championship, Renault replaced Trulli with  World Champion Jacques Villeneuve for the final three races. However, Villeneuve – away from F1 racing for almost an entire season and struggling to acclimatise quickly to racing at the premier level – did not impress, and the team finished third behind Villeneuve's former team BAR.

2005 season

Giancarlo Fisichella was Trulli's replacement for the  season. He took advantage of a rain-affected qualifying session to win the first race of the season, the Australian Grand Prix. Fernando Alonso then won the next three races to build a considerable lead in the Drivers' World Championship, thereby doing the same for Renault in the Constructors' Championship. Meanwhile, Fisichella failed to finish several races. After the San Marino Grand Prix, Renault and Alonso's championship leads came under attack from a fast-but-fragile McLaren-Mercedes team and Kimi Räikkönen respectively for the Drivers' Championship. McLaren took the lead of the Constructors' World Championship by securing a one-two finish at the Brazilian Grand Prix, but that was to be the race in which Alonso secured the Drivers' title, becoming the youngest ever driver to do so. This achievement was followed by a win in China to secure the Constructors' World Championship for Renault after McLaren driver Juan Pablo Montoya's car was badly damaged by a drain cover coming loose on the track. This broke Ferrari's six-year stranglehold on that title. It was the first time Renault had won the title as a manufacturer, and Renault became only the second French constructor (after the triumph of Matra in ) and the first French-licensed team to win the title.

2006 season

Fernando Alonso and Giancarlo Fisichella were retained for 2006, while test driver Franck Montagny was replaced by Heikki Kovalainen. The team's 2006 contender, the R26 – featuring a seven-speed gearbox made of titanium, was unveiled at a launch event on 31 January.

Alonso won the opening Bahrain Grand Prix as well as the Australian Grand Prix and finished second in Malaysia behind teammate Fisichella to claim Renault's first one-two finish since René Arnoux and Alain Prost in 1982. Alonso took two more second places, and then wins at his home Grand Prix in Spain, and at the Monaco Grand Prix. Fisichella took 8th, 6th and 3rd-place finishes in the San Marino Grand Prix, European Grand Prix and the Spanish Grand Prix.

The team celebrated its 200th Grand Prix at Silverstone, which was won by Alonso. As the season progressed to its North American stint, Alonso won the Canadian Grand Prix in Montreal, Canada. At the U.S Grand Prix, Ferrari had a distinct performance advantage over the whole weekend. However, Renault were the fastest of all the Michelin runners. Fisichella finished 3rd, while Alonso finished 5th.

At the French Grand Prix, Renault was expected to be faster than Ferrari, but Ferrari again had the advantage. Alonso ran third for most of the race, unable to challenge the Ferraris of Schumacher and Massa. However, a tactical switch to a two-stop strategy enabled him to pass Massa and finish second.

On 21 July 2006, the FIA banned the use of mass damper systems, developed and first used by Renault and subsequently used by 7 other teams, including Ferrari. Flavio Briatore claimed that McLaren had raised the issue of the system's legality with the FIA. The system used a spring-mounted mass in the nose cone to reduce the sensitivity of the car to vibration. This was particularly effective in corners and over kerbs to keep the tyres in closer contact to the track surface than they would otherwise be. However race stewards at the German Grand Prix deemed the system legal. The FIA announced its intention to appeal that decision and Renault announced they would not race with the system for fear of retrospective punishment if the appeal was upheld. Renault's performance at the German Grand Prix was one of their worst of the season; however, the team blamed blistering of their Michelin tyres rather than the loss of the mass damper system. The FIA International Court of Appeal met in Paris on 22 August 2006, to examine the appeal made by the FIA against the decision of the German Grand Prix stewards. The Court ruled that the use of the device known as a Tuned Mass Damper is an infringement of Article 3.15 of the Formula One Technical Regulations.

Points scored in the Brazilian Grand Prix secured the Constructors' Championship for Renault in 2006.

2007 season

Renault confirmed Giancarlo Fisichella and Heikki Kovalainen as their race drivers for 2007 with Nelson Piquet Jr. and Ricardo Zonta as test drivers. The car for 2007, the R27, was unveiled on 24 January 2007 in Amsterdam and bore a new yellow, blue, orange and white livery in deference to the corporate colours of ING, the Dutch financial group based in Amsterdam. Renault engines were also supplied to the Red Bull Racing team for the 2007 season.

Renault struggled in comparison to their form in previous seasons in Australia, with Giancarlo Fisichella finishing the race in 5th place. Rookie Heikki Kovalainen struggled even more than the Italian, spinning his car as he chased Toyota's Ralf Schumacher and ending up in 10th place. Results did not improve until the start of the European season, although both drivers finished in the points in the next race at Malaysia. Heikki Kovalainen struggled in Bahrain too, although the gap between himself and Fisichella at the end of the race was not as great as was seen at Melbourne, with Fisichella finishing only 8th. The team's pace began to pick up in Barcelona, with both drivers making it into Q3, setting competitive lap times in the race (4th fastest lap for Kovalainen) and looking set for 5th and 8th, only to be hampered by an identical problem on both fuel rigs, forcing both drivers to make extra pitstops which dropped them back to 7th and 9th.

On 8 November 2007, the FIA accused Renault F1 of having McLaren F1 technical information in their possession. According to the charge, the information in hand "included the layout and critical dimensions of the McLaren car as well as details of McLaren's fuelling system, gear assembly, hydraulic control system and suspension". The hearing on this matter took place in Monaco on 6 December 2007. The charge faced by Renault F1 – breaching of article 151c of the Sporting Regulations – was the same as that faced by McLaren earlier on in 2007 in the espionage controversy involving Ferrari & McLaren. The FIA found Renault F1 in breach of article 151c but did not penalise the team.

2008 season

Alonso drove alongside promoted test driver Nelson Piquet Jr. and was believed to have secured number one status within the team. The team similarly started in 2008 as the year before; Fernando Alonso managed to garner fourth at the opening Australian Grand Prix as a result of a mistake from a previous Renault employee Heikki Kovalainen. However, the form was still short of 2006 by a large degree over the first half of the 2008 season. The team brought new parts to the Spanish Grand Prix, including a new engine-cover, dubbed the "Shark-fin", similar to the one introduced by Red Bull on their RB4. Alonso managed to qualify on the front row for that race on a light fuel-load, yet retired with an engine failure halfway through. Alonso's front row qualifying performance in Spain was a rare moment of achievement from the former World Champion. Both cars retired at the Canadian Grand Prix and Nelson Piquet Jr., who retired from six of the first nine races, failed to score until the French Grand Prix.

The German Grand Prix heralded a change in the team's fortune. Piquet Jr. benefited from the deployment of the safety car to secure Renault's first podium of the year with a second. Both drivers scored at the Hungarian Grand Prix although they failed to pick up anything at Valencia two weeks later. Two fourth places for Alonso in Belgium and Italy were a prelude to the Singapore Grand Prix, in which Alonso profited from the early crash of his teammate (later revealed to be a deliberate crash to aid the Spaniard. See: Renault Formula One crash controversy) to claim his first victory of the season, and Renault's first since the 2006 Japanese Grand Prix. This victory made Alonso and Renault the first-ever winners of a Formula One race held under floodlights. Renault underlined their return to the front at the subsequent Japanese Grand Prix, in which Alonso steered clear of Lewis Hamilton's first-corner mistake to record another win. Piquet Jr. finished fourth in the team's best performance of the season. Further double points finish in China was followed by Alonso's second-place finish at the season-ending Brazilian Grand Prix. The Renault R28 was believed by many insiders to have overtaken BMW Sauber by season's end as the closest challenger to the domination of the sport by Ferrari and McLaren.

2009 season

Renault entered the season with high hopes of challenging both world titles. Although Alonso managed four points finishes in the first six races, it was soon clear that this target was unrealistic. By mid-season, it appeared as though Renault were making progress, with Alonso setting the fastest lap in Germany and securing pole position in Hungary, albeit on a light fuel load. However, Alonso was forced to retire early in Hungary due to a fuel pump failure, after a front wheel came loose as it was incorrectly fitted at his first pit stop. At Belgium Alonso again looked like scoring a podium for the team but had to retire with another problem with one of his wheels which was damaged as a result of a first-lap clash with Adrian Sutil. Piquet performed poorly in the first half of the season and was replaced by Romain Grosjean for the last third of the season. Neither Piquet nor Grosjean managed to score a point. A podium in Singapore was little consolation in what had been a frustrating and controversial season for the team.

Renault had been suspended for one race (the 2009 European Grand Prix) due to the incident involving Fernando Alonso's wheel not being fitted properly in the 2009 Hungarian Grand Prix, however, this has been overturned on appeal following a decision from the FIA on 17 August 2009.

On 4 August, Nelson Piquet Jr. was told by Renault he would not continue driving for them for the rest of the season. "I have received notice from Renault of its intention to stop me from driving for them in the current F1 season", read a statement on Piquet's website. Piquet had described the  season as "the worst period of my career" and had criticised team boss Flavio Briatore.

After his first podium of the year in Singapore, Fernando Alonso confirmed that he would be leaving Renault, moving to Ferrari in 2010.

Race rigging allegations

During the 2009 season, the actions of Renault F1 during the 2008 season were examined over alleged race-fixing. The issue surrounded Nelson Piquet Jr.'s crash during the 2008 Singapore Grand Prix which Renault teammate Fernando Alonso went on to win. At the time, Piquet Jr. had characterised the incident as a simple mistake. After Piquet Jr. left the Renault team in August 2009, allegations surfaced that this crash had been deliberate, to give an advantage to Alonso. Following a Fédération Internationale de l'Automobile (FIA) investigation in which Piquet Jr. stated he had been asked by Renault team principal Flavio Briatore and engineer Pat Symonds to stage the crash, on 4 September 2009 Renault were charged with conspiracy and race-fixing and were due to face the FIA World Motor Sport Council in Paris on 21 September 2009. Initially, Renault and Briatore stated they would take legal action against Piquet Jr. for making false allegations, however, before the meeting, Renault announced they would not contest the charges, and that Briatore and Symonds had left the team. At the meeting, the Council banned Renault from Formula One, but suspended this sanction for two years, meaning Renault would have been thrown out of Formula One if a similar incident occurred before the end of the 2011 season.  FIA stated that Renault would have likely been thrown out of Formula One if it had not taken swift action in pushing out Briatore and Symonds.  At the same meeting, Briatore was banned from FIA events for life, while Symonds received a five-year ban.  The bans on Briatore and Symonds were subsequently overturned by a French court in 2010.  FIA, Briatore and Symonds reached a settlement that allowed Briatore and Symonds to return to FIA in 2011 and to Formula One in 2013.

2010 season

In 2010, Renault sold a majority stake in the team to Genii Capital, a Luxembourg based investment company. However Renault still retained a 25% share in the team and continued as an engine supplier. Robert Kubica was signed as Alonso's replacement on 7 October 2009, but following the shareholding deal, Kubica and his manager Daniel Morelli asked for clarification on the management structure before committing to the outfit. However, in the new year, clarification was sought and Kubica was ready to commit to the outfit. On 31 January, Vitaly Petrov was signed to be Kubica's teammate, becoming Russia's first Formula One driver.

On 5 January, Éric Boullier was announced as the new team principal at Renault, replacing Bob Bell, who would return to his former role as Technical Director.

At the opening round in Bahrain, Petrov retired with broken suspension while in the pit lane on lap 14, and Kubica finished in eleventh place.

Kubica took his first podium with the team, with a second-place finish in Australia. Petrov retired from the race, after spinning off the circuit.

Kubica finished the next 3 races in the points, a 4th place in Malaysia, 5th place in Shanghai, and 8th place in Barcelona. Petrov meanwhile scored his first points in Formula 1 in China with his 7th place, it could have been more, but he spun off whilst in fourth, yet he still recovered to bring some points home.

After setting fast times on Thursday and the fastest time in Saturday's practice session, followed by 2nd place in qualifying, Kubica finished in 3rd place in Monaco, just 1.6 seconds behind the winner. Petrov retired in the closing laps of the race but was still classified 13th.

Vitaly Petrov was out-qualified and out-raced by Robert Kubica at almost every race. However, Petrov did find considerable form at the  when he out-qualified Kubica for the first time and finished the race 5th. However, in Belgium, Petrov made a mistake that ended with a crash in the first session of qualifying when he explored the kerbs at Liege corner, claiming he was testing to see how wet they were and if they were usable on his flying lap. His failure to set a time placed him 24th on the grid, though a gearbox penalty to Sauber's Pedro de la Rosa promoted him to 23rd. However, he went on to finish ninth, resulting in three consecutive points finishes in a row. In Singapore, Petrov was running seventh before being pushed off by Nico Hülkenberg, whilst Kubica was forced to make an unscheduled stop late in the race with a puncture, before going on to recover almost every place he had lost.

Lotus Renault GP (2011)

2011 season

On 5 November 2010, Autosport reported that Renault was poised to scale back its involvement in 2011 and become only an engine supplier, with the team closing in on a tie-up with Lotus Cars to buy its 25% stake in the team. The deal was finalised in early December 2010, with the team to be renamed Lotus Renault GP for 2011, under a sponsorship deal signed with Lotus Cars until 2017. Renault continued to support the team by supplying engines and its expertise and thus Red Bull Racing was promoted to Renault's full-works partnership team. The Renault chassis name continued to be used, with Renault branding featuring in the new black and gold livery that was last used when Renault and Lotus joined forces in the 1980s, harking back to the John Player Special livery of the time. Despite being rebranded to Lotus, Renault still supplied free engines for the Lotus team until 2014.

During 2011, the team raced against another team that was using the Lotus name. The team which raced in the 2010 season as Lotus Racing (using a licence from Group Lotus which was later terminated by Group Lotus) rebranded itself as "Team Lotus" for the 2011 season after purchasing the privately owned rights to the historic name.

This left the sport without any team racing under a French licence for the first time since the  season. Along with the launch of their new car, Lotus Renault GP announced that they had hired Jean Alesi as an ambassador for the team and test driver for the T125 single-seater project.

On 6 February 2011, Robert Kubica was severely injured in an accident during a rally in Italy. It was unclear if he would be able to return to Formula One during the 2011 season. On 16 February, it was announced that Nick Heidfeld was signed as Kubica's replacement, while Kubica still remained signed with the team for 2011.

Heidfeld finished third in the next race in Malaysia, while Petrov retired late on; he hit a bump caused by a drainage gully which launched his car into the air and broke the car's steering column on landing. In the Chinese Grand Prix, Petrov finished ninth having started tenth after a mechanical problem in qualifying, with Heidfeld finishing twelfth. Heidfeld and Petrov finished seventh and eighth in Turkey, as the team's early-season performance began to fade. Heidfeld finished ninth in Spain after missing qualifying due to a fire in practice, while Petrov finished just outside the points in eleventh place. Heidfeld scored more points in Monaco with eighth place, while Petrov retired after being caught up in an accident involving several other cars. Petrov finished fifth in the rain-affected , with Heidfeld retiring after damaging his car's front wing in a collision with Kamui Kobayashi. The team endured a difficult weekend in Valencia, as Heidfeld scored a single point for tenth place and Petrov finished 15th.

Heidfeld managed 8th place in the race, with Petrov 12th.

On 29 November 2011, the team confirmed that they had hired Kimi Räikkönen to drive full-time in 2012. On 9 December 2011, the team also confirmed that Romain Grosjean would join Räikkönen in 2012. During the 2012 season, the team would be known as the Lotus F1 Team.

Renault Sport Formula One Team and Renault F1 Team (2016–2020)

2016 season

On 28 September 2015, Renault Sport F1 announced that a letter of intent between Renault Group and Gravity Motorsports which is owned by Genii Capital had been signed and over the following weeks a takeover transaction would be discussed for the Lotus F1 Team (which was previously owned by Renault until 2010) in hopes that the team would compete in the  season as Renault Sport Formula One Team in response to the collapse of Renault's relationship with Red Bull. It was speculated that F1 veteran Alain Prost, who drove for Renault from 1981 to 1983, could take a senior role in the team.

On 3 December 2015, Renault announced that they had purchased the Lotus F1 Team and were preparing for the 2016 season with further information to be released in early 2016. As Renault returned to Formula One as a full-works constructor team, Red Bull Racing was officially demoted to Renault's customer team and thus received TAG Heuer rebadging sponsorship from 2016 to 2018 seasons.

On 3 February 2016, Renault unveiled the testing livery for their 2016 car, the Renault R.S.16, and confirmed Kevin Magnussen and Jolyon Palmer as its two race drivers, 2015 GP3 champion Esteban Ocon as its reserve driver, Carmen Jordá as its development driver, and that multiple drivers, including 2015 Formula Renault 3.5 champion Oliver Rowland, Jack Aitken, Louis Delétraz and Kevin Jorg are a part of its driver academy. Additionally, Bob Bell (formerly of Mercedes, Marussia and the previous incarnation of Renault) was confirmed as the team's chief technical officer and Frédéric Vasseur (of ART Grand Prix) as the new racing director. Renault Sport F1 is mainly partnered with the Renault-Nissan Alliance. However it also has other sponsorships with partners including Bell & Ross, Devialet, EMC, Genii Capital, Infiniti, Total, CD-adapco, Microsoft, Pirelli, OZ Racing and Jack & Jones.

The team finished the season in ninth place with 8 points.

2017 season

On 11 January 2017, Frédéric Vasseur left the team after disagreements with team personnel, therefore the team was managed by president Jérôme Stoll and managing director Cyril Abiteboul.

On 14 October 2016, it was announced that Nico Hülkenberg would join the team for the  season. Kevin Magnussen later chose to leave the team to join Haas, with Jolyon Palmer remaining at the team for a second season, but was replaced by Carlos Sainz Jr. from the  onwards, after only one point scoring finish. Sainz had a good debut at the United States Grand Prix, finishing seventh and out qualifying his teammate who retired from the race. The team finished the season in sixth place with 57 points.

2018 season 

Nico Hülkenberg continued to drive for Renault in 2018 as he had signed a multi-year deal the year before. After joining the team mid-season in 2017, Carlos Sainz Jr. continued to drive for them in 2018. They finished 4th in the championship with 122 points.

2019 season 

On 3 August 2018, it was announced that Red Bull Racing driver Daniel Ricciardo would be joining the team on a two-year deal to partner Hülkenberg.

Plagued by reliability issues at the start of the season, and aerodynamic poor performance, the team finished 5th in the Constructors' Championship, failing to escape the midfield. Also of note was the 2019 Japanese Grand Prix, which the team was disqualified from as a result of their automatic brake balance changing system, which was deemed illegal.

At the end of the season, the team announced changes to the aerodynamic department of their team as a result of the R.S.19's failures. Chassis Technical Director Nick Chester would leave the team, with former Ferrari and McLaren chassis engineer Pat Fry and former Williams and Ferrari aerodynamicist Dirk de Beer to join the team.

2020 season 

Former Force India driver and Mercedes reserve driver Esteban Ocon joined Renault for the 2020 season, on a multiple-year contract, replacing Nico Hülkenberg. In Belgium, Renault finished 4th and 5th, scoring 23 points in one single race, their most in any race ever as a constructor and their first fastest lap for a decade. At the Eifel Grand Prix raced on the Nürburgring circuit, Ricciardo scored a third-place finish, the team's first podium since Malaysia 2011. Ricciardo also scored a third-place finish at the Emilia Romagna Grand Prix. Ocon also scored a second-place finish at the Sakhir Grand Prix, his first podium and Renault's third of the season.

Renault was rebranded as Alpine for the 2021 season.

Engine supplier

Original turbo era (1980s)

Renault began manufacturing engines at the Viry-Châtillon factory in 1976, after closing the former Alpine competition department, which was run in conjunction with the Formula One team under the Renault Sport division. It manufactured the first turbocharged engine seen on the category, the Renault-Gordini EF1 1.5 litres V6, at a time where the naturally aspirated 3-litre engines were predominant. Initially only supplying engines to the works team, Renault began a customer programme in 1983 when it became Team Lotus' engine supplier. Mecachrome, a precision engineering company, prepared the engines for the customer teams.

Though not competitive initially, with the recruitment of designer Gérard Ducarouge the marque gained competitiveness towards the later part of the 1983 season into 1984, with Nigel Mansell and Elio de Angelis scoring regular podiums. That year, Renault also began supplying engines to the Ligier team, which scored three points in 1984, an improvement over not being classified in the 1983 championship. Ayrton Senna joined Team Lotus in 1985 and the combination of his talent and the fast, but fuel-inefficient Lotus 97T gained eight pole positions and three wins (two to Senna, one to de Angelis), but unreliability prevented a sustained attempt at either title. The Tyrrell team started using the Renault engine from the seventh Grand Prix of the year, while Ligier gained three podiums in the Ligier JS25. In 1986, aristocrat Johnny Dumfries was chosen to be Senna's new partner at Lotus after Senna vetoed the original choice of Derek Warwick. More pole positions and two wins for the Brazilian followed with the Lotus 98T, but the car followed similar problems as its predecessor with reliability problems and poor fuel consumption. This saw to it that Lotus could not sustain a season-long challenge to leading teams McLaren and Williams.

After the 1985 season, the Renault works team ended participation in Formula One but continued as an engine supplier for Ligier, Tyrrell and Lotus. 1986 saw the introduction of the EF15B engine, which included several innovations, like static ignition and pneumatic valve return. Renault Sport stopped its engine program at the end of the year, having scored 19 pole positions and 5 Grand Prix victories with customer teams.

Naturally aspirated engines (1990s and 2000s)

Renault returned as a Formula One engine supplier in 1989 with the banning of turbocharged engines, in partnership with the Williams team. The Viry factory produced the first pneumatic valved 3.5 V10 engine, the RS1, while other engine manufacturers supplied V8 (Ford, Judd and Yamaha), V10 (Honda), or V12 (Ferrari and Lamborghini) engines. The Williams-Renault combination scored its first victory at the wet 1989 Canadian Grand Prix, with Thierry Boutsen, and finished their initial season together with Boutsen winning the very wet 1989 Australian Grand Prix.

Former customer team Ligier also resumed using the Renault engines in 1992. Alain Prost won the Drivers' Championship after winning 7 of the 16 rounds, and his teammate Damon Hill won another three Grands Prix.

 saw Williams driver Ayrton Senna killed at the 1994 San Marino Grand Prix, which left the Brazilian's inexperienced teammate Damon Hill as team leader. Hill was 37 points behind Championship leader Michael Schumacher by the French Grand Prix, but had managed to close the gap down to 1 point before the last race in Adelaide. The two drivers collided controversially and retired from the race, making Schumacher the Drivers' Champion while Williams retained the Constructors' Championship.

In 1995 engine regulations reduced maximum engine displacement to three litres, with Renault adapting the RS7, making it lighter and featuring a fly-by-wire throttle. Benetton won the constructors' title by 29 points, winning 11 races during the season. Schumacher and other Benetton staff left for Ferrari in 1996, and the team finished in the third position for both years.

Renault left the F1 again at the end of 1997, and evolutions of its last engine, the RS9, were still used by many teams during the following seasons. Renault continued working with Mecachrome, which paid for development of the engines, and supplied them to Williams under the Mecachrome name. Benetton continued to use the engines under the Playlife brand until 2000, although only achieved several podiums during this time. Flavio Briatore's company Supertec distributed the engines from 1999, with Williams and BAR using them under the Supertec name that year, and the Arrows cars using them in 2000. Although on a few occasions points were scored, ultimately the engines were not successful under Supertec's control, subsequently each team moved to another supplier after one season.

After Renault purchased the Benetton team, they did not supply customer engines until , when they signed an agreement with Red Bull Racing on 15 September 2006. Drivers Sebastian Vettel and Mark Webber won another five victories to allow the team to finish second in the Constructors' Championship. In 2010, Vettel and Red Bull won both championships, making it the ninth title for a Renault engine, and the first for the RS27.

Modern era and return of turbos (2010s)

At the end of 2010, when Renault sold their remaining stake in the Enstone-based Formula One team, the engine operations at Viry-Châtillon were formed into a subsidiary known as Renault Sport F1. Renault Sport F1 continued to supply engines to their former works team and Red Bull, and expanded their customers to Lotus Racing at the end of 2010. As a result of Renault's full-constructor team being rebranded to Lotus Renault GP, Red Bull Racing was officially promoted to Renault's full-works partnership team and thus received free engines from Renault and thanks to Infiniti sponsorship. Vettel held the championship lead from the first race in Australia, and finished in first or second position in each Grand Prix until his home race at Germany, where he ended in fourth. He then resumed his podium run, with the exception of one retirement, until the end of the season, while Webber finished behind until the final two races. In 2012, the Red Bull team and Sebastian Vettel were able to achieve both championships for a third time, despite the fact the RB8 car did not enjoy the dominance of the previous season and suffered some reliability problems related to the RS27's alternator. That year, Williams returned to its association with Renault, signing a deal to receive the RS27 engines until the end of 2013. Red Bull came back to a dominant pace in the 2013 season and both the team and Sebastian Vettel secured their fourth consecutive title at the 2013 Indian Grand Prix.

Hybrid turbocharger V6 era

On 21 June 2013, Renault unveiled its new engine at the Paris Air Show. It was named Energy F1 after the Renault's road car engines. Red Bull and Caterham (formerly Lotus Racing/Team Lotus) had deals to use Renault engines until 2016. At the 2013 Monaco Grand Prix, Scuderia Toro Rosso announced a customer engine supply contract with Renault for the period 2014–2016.

During the early 2014 tests in Jerez the new Renault engines showed problems with both the turbo unit and the energy recovery systems. Partial fixes were introduced for the last pre-season tests in Bahrain, especially software upgrades. In the early part of the season, the Energy F1-2014 was the subject of various criticisms for its poor reliability and lack of top speed, including one by Red Bull's boss Christian Horner which described the performance as "unacceptable" after an unsuccessful team's home race in Austria. Renault introduced revised components and more software upgrades trying to reduce the gap with rivals.

In 2015, Red Bull unilaterally terminated their contract for 2016 with Renault, alleging a lack of performance from the Renault Energy F1-2015 compared to rivals. However, they later renegotiated their agreement, as plans from Red Bull to get a more competitive power unit failed. In 2016, the Renault power units used by Red Bull would be badged as TAG Heuer. Renault then terminated their 2016 engine supply agreement with Scuderia Toro Rosso, and the team returned to their former supplier Ferrari. During 2016, Red Bull GmbH renewed their contract for a further two years for Red Bull Racing. They also announced that Scuderia Toro Rosso would also return to Renault power from 2017. However, the contract still gave Red Bull the option to badge their engines as they wish, with Christian Horner stating that Red Bull Racing would continue with the TAG Heuer badging despite without Renault works support.

In September 2017, Renault and McLaren announced the latter would use customer Renault engines from 2018 to 2020 in order to aid the competitiveness of the Renault works team. Toro Rosso in turn switched to full-works Honda engines, terminating their 2018 customer deal with Renault. In June 2018, Red Bull announced they would also use full-works Honda engines from 2019 onwards. As McLaren lost its Renault customer partnership due to switch to Mercedes-AMG High Performance Powertrains power units from 2021 season, Renault returned to single-team engine supply for the first time since 2006 season.

The Enstone-based team was rebranded to Alpine from the 2021 season onwards, and the Renault brand would continue in Formula One as its engine supplier for the first time since 2015.

Formula One engine supplier results

* Excludes factory team.

Alpine Young Driver Academy

As part of the company's return to Formula One, it set up a young driver academy, which is tasked with finding future Renault Sport Formula 1 World Champions. The academy was rebranded as Alpine Academy following the rebranding of Renault F1 Team to Alpine F1 Team in 2021.

Formula One results

As a constructor, Renault have achieved the following statistics:
 Constructors' Championships winning percentage: 
 Drivers' Championships winning percentage: 
 Winning percentage:

Footnotes

References

External links

  
 French Grand Prix 1979, INA archives video (French soundtrack)
 Renault's Statistics in F1

Formula One engine manufacturers
 
Formula One entrants
Formula One
Laureus World Sports Awards winners
British auto racing teams
British racecar constructors
French auto racing teams
French racecar constructors
Companies based in Oxfordshire
Companies based in Paris
Alpine F1 Team
Red Bull Racing
Scuderia Toro Rosso
McLaren Group
Formula One World Constructors' Champions